Anstey is a surname held by approximately eight thousand people worldwide. The surname itself originated in the 12th century from Anstey in Hertfordshire. Notable people with the surname include:

 Brendel Anstey, English footballer who played for Aston Villa and Leicester City
 Bruce Anstey, New Zealand motorcycle racer
 Chris Anstey, Australian basketball player
 Christopher Anstey (1724–1805), English writer and poet
 Dan Anstey, Australian radio and television presenter
 Edgar Anstey (1907–1987), English film maker
Edgar Anstey (1917–2009), British psychologist 
 F. Anstey pseudonym for Thomas Anstey Guthrie (1856–1934), an English novelist and journalist who wrote comic novels
 Frank Anstey, Australian politician in both the Victorian and Commonwealth parliaments
 George Alexander Anstey (1814–1895), South Australian viticulturist and Member of Parliament
 Harry Anstey, Australian prospector and politician
 Nigel Anstey, British geophysicist
 Percy Anstey (1876–1920), British actor and economist 
 Thomas Chisholm Anstey, British parliamentarian, lawyer and second Attorney General of Hong Kong
 Vera Anstey (1889–1976), British economist

See also 
 Anstee
 Ansty (disambiguation)

References 

English-language surnames
Surnames of English origin
English toponymic surnames